In mathematics, Hall's marriage theorem, proved by , is a theorem with two equivalent formulations:
 The combinatorial formulation deals with a collection of finite sets. It gives a necessary and sufficient condition for being able to select a distinct element from each set.
 The graph theoretic formulation deals with a bipartite graph. It gives a necessary and sufficient condition for finding a matching that covers at least one side of the graph.

Combinatorial formulation

Statement
Let  be a family of finite sets. Here,  is itself allowed to be infinite (although the sets in it are not) and to contain the same set multiple times. This concept can be formalized by defining a transversal to be the image of an injective function  such that  for each . An alternative term for transversal is system of distinct representatives.

The collection  satisfies the marriage condition when each subfamily of  contains at least as many distinct members as its number of sets. That is, for all ,

Hall's theorem states that the converse is also true:

Examples 

Example 1
Because this family has at least one transversal, the marriage condition is met. Every subfamily of  has equal size to the set of representatives it is mapped to, which is less than or equal to the size of the union of the subfamily.

Example 2
 Consider  with  No valid transversal exists; the marriage condition is violated as is shown by the subfamily .

Graph theoretic formulation 

Proof of the graph theoretic version 
Easy direction

Hard direction
 The theorem can be proven if the assumption that there is no -perfect matching leads to the conclusion that Hall's condition is violated for at least one . That is, .

Equivalence of the combinatorial formulation and the graph-theoretic formulation 
In this way, the combinatorial formulation for finite families of finite sets and the graph-theoretic formulation for finite graphs are equivalent.

The same equivalence extends to infinite families of finite sets and to certain infinite graphs. In this case, the condition that each set be finite corresponds to a condition that in the bipartite graph , every vertex in  should have finite degree.

Topological proof 
Hall's theorem can be proved (non-constructively) based on Sperner's lemma.

Applications
The theorem has many applications. For example, for a standard deck of cards, dealt into 13 piles of 4 cards each, the marriage theorem implies that it is possible to select one card from each pile so that the selected cards contain exactly one card of each rank (Ace, 2, 3, ..., Queen, King). More generally, any regular bipartite graph has a perfect matching.

The marriage theorem is used in the usual proofs of the fact that an  Latin rectangle can always be extended to an  Latin rectangle when , and so, ultimately to a Latin square.

Logical equivalences 

This theorem is part of a collection of remarkably powerful theorems in combinatorics, all of which are related to each other in an informal sense in that it is more straightforward to prove one of these theorems from another of them than from first principles. These include:

 The König–Egerváry theorem (1931) (Dénes Kőnig, Jenő Egerváry)
 König's theorem
 Menger's theorem (1927)
 The max-flow min-cut theorem (Ford–Fulkerson algorithm)
 The Birkhoff–Von Neumann theorem (1946)
 Dilworth's theorem.

In particular, there are simple proofs of the implications Dilworth's theorem ⇔ Hall's theorem ⇔ König–Egerváry theorem ⇔ König's theorem.

Infinite families

Marshall Hall Jr. variant 
By examining Philip Hall's original proof carefully, Marshall Hall Jr. (no relation to Philip Hall) was able to tweak the result in a way that permitted the proof to work for infinite . This variant refines the marriage theorem and provides a lower bound on the number of transversals that a given  may have. This variant is:

Suppose that (A1, A2, ..., An), where the Ai are finite sets that need not be distinct, is a family of sets satisfying the marriage condition, and suppose that |Ai| ≥ r for i = 1, ..., n. Then the number of different transversals for the family is at least r! if r ≤ n and r(r − 1) ... (r − n + 1) if r > n.

Recall that a transversal for a family S is an ordered sequence, so two different transversals could have exactly the same elements. For instance, the family A1 = {1, 2, 3}, A2 = {1, 2, 5} has both (1, 2) and (2, 1) as distinct transversals.

Marriage condition does not extend
The following example, due to Marshall Hall Jr., shows that the marriage condition will not guarantee the existence of a transversal in an infinite family in which infinite sets are allowed.

Let S be the family,  A0 = {1, 2, 3, ...}, A1 = {1}, A2 = {2}, ..., Ai = {i}, ...

The marriage condition holds for this infinite family, but no transversal can be constructed.

The more general problem of selecting a (not necessarily distinct) element from each of a collection of non-empty sets (without restriction as to the number of sets or the size of the sets) is permitted in general only if the axiom of choice is accepted.

The marriage theorem does extend to the infinite case if stated properly. Given a bipartite graph with sides A and B, we say that a subset C of B is smaller than or equal in size to a subset D of A in the graph if there exists an injection in the graph (namely, using only edges of the graph) from C to D, and that it is strictly smaller in the graph if in addition there is no injection in the graph in the other direction. Note that omitting in the graph yields the ordinary notion of comparing cardinalities. The infinite marriage theorem states that there exists an injection from A to B in the graph, if and only if there is no subset C of A such that N(C) is strictly smaller than C in the graph.

Fractional matching variant 
A fractional matching in a graph is an assignment of non-negative weights to each edge, such that the sum of weights adjacent to each vertex is at most 1. A fractional matching is X-perfect if the sum of weights adjacent to each vertex is exactly 1. The following are equivalent for a bipartite graph G = (X+Y, E):

 G admits an X-perfect matching.
 G admits an X-perfect fractional matching. The implication follows directly from the fact that X-perfect matching is a special case of an X-perfect fractional matching, in which each weight is either 1 (if the edge is in the matching) or 0 (if it is not).
 G satisfies Hall's marriage condition. The implication holds because, for each subset W of X, the sum of weights near vertices of W is |W|, so the edges adjacent to them are necessarily adjacent to at least |W| vertices of Y.

Quantitative variant 

When Hall's condition does not hold, the original theorem tells us only that a perfect matching does not exist, but does not tell what is the largest matching that does exist. To learn this information, we need the notion of deficiency of a graph. Given a bipartite graph G = (X+Y, E), the deficiency of G w.r.t. X is the maximum, over all subsets W of X, of the difference |W| - |NG(W)|. The larger is the deficiency, the farther is the graph from satisfying Hall's condition. 

Using Hall's marriage theorem, it can be proved that, if the deficiency of a bipartite graph G is d, then G admits a matching of size at least |X|-d.

Generalizations 

 A generalization of Hall's theorem to general graphs (that are not necessarily bipartite) is provided by the Tutte theorem.
 A generalization of Hall's theorem to bipartite hypergraphs is provided by various Hall-type theorems for hypergraphs.

Notes

References

External links 
 Marriage Theorem at cut-the-knot
 Marriage Theorem and Algorithm at cut-the-knot
 Hall's marriage theorem explained intuitively at Lucky's notes.

Matching (graph theory)
Theorems in combinatorics
Theorems in graph theory
Articles containing proofs